The Vegas 16 tournament was a postseason men's college basketball tournament. The tournament was managed by Lexington, Kentucky-based sports marketing firm bd Global. The tournament featured eight teams not selected for the NCAA Tournament or the NIT. The lone tournament took place March 28–30, 2016, at Mandalay Bay, in Paradise, Nevada.  The tournament field and seedings were announced after the NCAA Tournament field was revealed. CBS Sports Network was the television partner for the quarters, semis, and finals. Former UNLV and Arizona athletic director Jim Livengood was the chair of the tournament.  George Raveling, Debbie Antonelli,  John Balistere and Brooks Downing were on the selection committee.

Concept
The Vegas 16 was inspired by college bowl games, in which the destination was considered as much of a draw as the game itself. In contrast to other unofficial postseason tournaments such as the College Basketball Invitational and CollegeInsider.com Tournament (in which the home arenas of higher-ranked teams hosted most of the games), all games in the Vegas 16 were intended to be held in a single location, Las Vegas.

The Vegas 16 struggled to gain attention and fill its bracket throughout its existence. A number of schools instituted policies automatically declining invitations to all postseason tournaments other than the NCAA and NIT; the tournament's timing (two weeks after the NCAA and NIT fields were set) also worked against it. Unwilling to fill its field with subpar teams, the Vegas 16, contrary to its name, only filled eight slots in its field in its 2016 tournament and opted not to hold a 2017 tournament at all.

Television
The following is an overview and list of the announcers and television networks to broadcast the Vegas 16 Tournament Championship.

Champions

2016

The inaugural tournament planned on having 16 teams; however, due to many teams forgoing participating in post-season tournaments, only eight teams were selected.

The following eight teams participated in the inaugural (and as events would prove, only) tournament:

East Tennessee State
Louisiana Tech
Northern Illinois
Oakland
Old Dominion
Tennessee Tech
Towson
UC Santa Barbara

2017
It was announced on March 9, 2017, that the Vegas 16 tournament would not be held in 2017.

References

 
Recurring sporting events established in 2016
Recurring sporting events disestablished in 2017
College men's basketball competitions in the United States
Postseason college basketball competitions in the United States